Stephen Basil Wingfield Digby   was an  Anglican priest: the Archdeacon of Sarum from 1968 to 1979.

Born on 10 November 1910, he was educated at Marlborough and Christ Church, Oxford. He was ordained in 1937  and his first post was as a curate at St Paul's, Salisbury. After this he was Priest in charge at St George's, Poole and then Vicar of Sherborne. During the war he was a Chaplain to the Forces and was awarded the MBE in 1944.

He died on 22 January 1996.

References

1910 births
People educated at Marlborough College
Alumni of Christ Church, Oxford
Members of the Order of the British Empire
Archdeacons of Sarum
1996 deaths